Iker is a Basque male given name. The corresponding female name is Ikerne. It was created by the Spanish Basque writer Sabino Arana in his book  (Collection of Basque Saints' Names)—an effort to provide neologistic Basque versions of names instead of the traditional adaptations of Romance names. The name may refer to:

People

First name
Iker Begoña (born 1976), Spanish footballer 
Iker Camaño (born 1979), Spanish cyclist
Iker Casillas (born 1981), Spanish footballer
Iker Flores (born 1976), Spanish cyclist
Iker Gabaraín (born 1977), Spanish footballer
Iker Guarrotxena (born 1992), Spanish footballer
Iker Hernández (born 1994), Spanish footballer 
Iker Iturbe (born 1976), Spanish basketball player
Iker Jiménez (born 1973), Spanish journalist
Iker Lecuona (born 2000), Spanish motorcycle racer
Iker Leonet (born 1983), Spanish cyclist
Iker Losada (born 2001), Spanish footballer
Iker Martínez de Lizarduy (born 1977), Spanish sailor
Iker Muniain (born 1992), Spanish footballer
Iker Pajares (born 1996), Spanish squash player
Iker Romero (born 1980), Spanish handball player
Iker Undabarrena (born 1995), Spanish footballer
Iker Zubizarreta (born 1962), Venezuelan footballer

Surname
Jack Iker (born 1949), American bishop